Cybocephalus is a genus of beetles in the family Cybocephalidae, previously belonging to the subfamily Cybocephalinae of the family Nitidulidae, and comprising over 200 described species.

Selected species

 Cybocephalus aegyptianus Endrödy-Younga g
 Cybocephalus atomus C.Brisout de Barneville, 1866 g
 Cybocephalus balticus Kurochkin & Kirejtshuk, 2010 g
 Cybocephalus bourbonnensis Vinson, 1959 g
 Cybocephalus brevis Grouvelle, 1913 g
 Cybocephalus bulbophthalmus Endrödy-Younga, 1962 g
 Cybocephalus californicus Horn, 1879 i c g b
 Cybocephalus canariensis Endrody-Younga, 1968 g
 Cybocephalus caribaeus Smith g
 Cybocephalus championi Smith g
 Cybocephalus chlorocapitis g 
 Cybocephalus decaeni Vinson, 1959 g
 Cybocephalus diadematus Chevrolat, 1861 g
 Cybocephalus electricus Kurochkin & Kirejtshuk, 2010 g
 Cybocephalus etiennei Endrödy-Younga, 1982 g
 Cybocephalus festivus Erichson, 1845 g
 Cybocephalus flavocapitis Smith g
 Cybocephalus fodori Endrödy-Younga, 1965 g
 Cybocephalus freyi Endrody-Younga, 1968 g
 Cybocephalus gomyi Endrödy-Younga, 1982 g
 Cybocephalus heydeni Reitter, 1875 g
 Cybocephalus huastecus Smith g
 Cybocephalus hughscotti Vinson, 1959 g
 Cybocephalus kathrynae Smith in Smith and Cave, 2006 i c g
 Cybocephalus kerneggeri Kurochkin & Kirejtshuk, 2010 g
 Cybocephalus krimicus Endrody-Younga, 1968 g
 Cybocephalus liui Tian g
 Cybocephalus mauritiensis Vinson, 1959 g
 Cybocephalus mediterraneus Endrody-Younga, 1968 g
 Cybocephalus membranaceus Reitter, 1874 g
 Cybocephalus metallicus Baudi de Selve, 1870 g
 Cybocephalus micans Reitter, 1874 g
 Cybocephalus mollis Endrödy-Younga, 1964 g
 Cybocephalus nigritulus LeConte, 1863 i c g b
 Cybocephalus nipponicus Endrödy-Younga, 1971 i c g b
 Cybocephalus planiceps Endrödy-Younga, 1968 g
 Cybocephalus politissimus Reitter, 1898 g
 Cybocephalus politus Gyllenhal, 1813 g
 Cybocephalus pulchellus Erichson, 1845 g
 Cybocephalus pullus Endrödy-Younga, 1962 g
 Cybocephalus randalli Smith in Smith & Cave, 2006 i c g b
 Cybocephalus reitteri Uhagon, 1876 g
 Cybocephalus rufifrons Reitter, 1874 g
 Cybocephalus schwarzi Champion g
 Cybocephalus seminulum Baudi, 1870 g
 Cybocephalus similiceps Jacquelin du Val, 1858 g
 Cybocephalus sphaerula (Wollaston, 1854) g
 Cybocephalus taiwanensis Tian & Pan, 1994 g
 Cybocephalus tantillus Grouvelle, 1913 g
 Cybocephalus vinsoni Endrödy-Younga, 1964 g
 Cybocephalus wollastoni Har.Lindberg, 1951 g

Data sources: i = ITIS, c = Catalogue of Life, g = GBIF, b = Bugguide.net

References

Nitidulidae